= Patrick E. Chavis =

Indiana lawyer and politician

Patrick E. Chavis Jr. (July 21, 1921 - December 18, 1974) was a lawyer and state senator in Indiana. A Democrat, he was a state senator in Indiana from 1964 to 1968. Prior to serving in the senate, he was a prosecutor for Marion County and a public defender. He was a criminal court judge-elect at the time of his death.
